Poor Poor Paul is a 2003 Russian historical drama film. It is a biopic of Czar Paul I of Russia and the final film of the historical trilogy of Vitaly Melnikov "The Empire. The Beginning".

Plot
...The cold November of 1796. Empress Catherine the Great who undividedly ruled Russia for 34 years has died. The throne goes back to her son Paul I - a nervous and impetuous middle aged man, who is a captive of his own illusions. Deciding to change almost everything what he inherited from his unloved mother, Paul attracts supporters, one of whom is Count Peter Pahlen. He is an intelligent and calculating courtier who thanks to the boundless trust of the emperor gathers immense power in his hands. Pahlen initially supports Paul's reforms but then the situation changes...

The highest nobility in Russia, fueled by the money of England is extremely unhappy with the innovations of Paul I. One after another plots against him are conspired. Distraught by the suspicion directed towards him and fearing for his life, Paul punishes the innocent and the guilty, but this can not save the unfortunate emperor. The main conspiracy against Paul involves his own sons, Alexander and Constantine, and its general command is carried out by Count Pahlen! Paul eventually falls in total despair after he learns of such a comprehensive betrayal, he ceases to resist and the doomed man awaits the conspirators-murderers in his bedroom at the Mikhailovsky Castle ...

Cast
 Viktor Sukhorukov – Emperor Paul I of Russia
 Oleg Yankovskiy – Count Pahlen
 Oksana Mysina – Maria Feodorovna, Paul's wife
 Yuliya Mavrina – Anna Lopukhina
 Aleksey Barabash – Alexander, Paul's oldest son 
 Anna Molchanova – Elizabeth Alexeievna, Alexander's wife
 Yevgeni Karpov – Konstantin, Paul's son
 Igor Shibanov –  Ivan Kutaisov, Paul's valet
 Vadim Lobanov – Alexander Bezborodko
 Sergey Barkovsky – John Rogerson, personal doctor of Catherine the Great
 Boris Khvoshnyansky – José de Ribas
 Andrey Chumanov – Platon Zubov
 Ivan Parshin – Valerian Zubov
 Sergey Murzin – Nikolay Zubov
 Vera Karpova – Baroness Livsi
 Aleksandr Grigoryants – Vincenzo Brenna
 Dmitriy Sutyrin – Duke Yashvil

Awards
2003 - Kinotavr - M. Tariveridiev prize for Best Music (Andrei Petrov).
2003 - The Golden Aries Award - Best Male Actor (Viktor Sukhorukov).
2003 - Golden Eagle Award - Best Costume Design (Larisa Konnikova), Best Music (Andrei Petrov), Best Supporting Actor (Oleg Yankovsky).
2003 - Nika Award - Best Male Actor (Viktor Sukhorukov).

References

External links
 

2003 films
Lenfilm films
2000s Russian-language films
Russian biographical drama films
Russian historical drama films
Cultural depictions of Paul I of Russia
2000s biographical drama films
2000s historical drama films